Zigrida Ansamblis (Zigrīda Ansamblis) is an Australian folk music band formed in Brisbane, Queensland. The ensemble makes extensive use of the kokles, a type of box zither, in their performances. Zigrida Ansamblis is particularly notable as the only currently active kokle ensemble in Australia.

Zigrida Ansamblis tracks have received airtime on ABC Classic FM, an Australia-wide national radio broadcast.

Albums
 Pumpura iela: From Seed to Bloom (2006)

References

External links
 Official website

Australian folk music groups
Musical groups from Brisbane